Thomas Jacob Bergersen (born 4 July 1980, Trondheim, Norway) is a Norwegian composer, multi-instrumentalist, and the co-founder of the production music company Two Steps From Hell. Bergersen's compositions have featured in many motion picture campaigns, such as Avatar, Pirates of the Caribbean, The Twilight Saga, The Chronicles of Narnia, Harry Potter, Da Vinci Code, The Mummy, The Dark Knight, Tron: Legacy and hundreds more. Bergersen has scored over one thousand soundtracks and film trailers.

Career
He started his musical career as a demoscener, writing tracked modules under the name Lioz in the group Index. Bergersen worked with fellow Norwegian artist Boom Jinx on the 2007 trance single "Remember September".

In May 2010, Bergersen and his business partner, Nick Phoenix, released a debut public Epic Music Two Steps From Hell album titled Invincible. Several additional commercial album releases followed, including Archangel and SkyWorld. Bergersen also performed in a 2013 live concert at the Walt Disney Concert Hall. In 2010 Bergersen composed the original music for the movie The Human Experience. The Soundtrack CD was released on 29 March 2011.

Bergersen released a solo-produced soundtrack titled Illusions in 2011. His second solo album, Sun, was released in September 2014. He has also released several commercial singles since 2011, including "Heart" and "The Hero in Your Heart," which were intended to provide disaster relief in the wake of the Tōhoku earthquake and Typhoon Haiyan, respectively.

In March 2020, the album series Humanity was announced. Humanity is intended to be a seven-part set exploring all aspects of human emotion. On 1 July 2020, Humanity - Chapter I was released. Humanity - Chapter II was released on 11 November 2020, followed by Humanity - Chapter III on 6 May 2021, and Humanity - Chapter IV on 2 September 2021.

Personal life 
Bergersen said he moved from Los Angeles to Miami, and then to Seattle between 2010–2014 in the liner notes of his album Sun. The song "Cassandra" on the same album was inspired by his then-girlfriend. Bergersen  considers himself a gamer and plays games such as Duke Nukem 3D, Doom, Quake and Hitman: Absolution.

Music 
Bergersen claims to be influenced by musicians from many genres, such as Wolfgang Amadeus Mozart and Katy Perry. However, he stated that Gustav Mahler is among his primary influences. He dislikes the concept of music genres, which he thinks limit music to certain structures for the purpose of classification. For this reason he generally avoids following genres and industry conventions and follows his own intuition instead.

He draws inspiration from his personal emotions and events in romantic relationships, and anything "unique and beautiful" in his surroundings.

Thomas is using some sample libraries that are publicly available, however most of his sounds are bespoke and he has sampled many orchestras, world instruments, and other sounds himself from all over the world, those samples are available only to him. According to Thomas, he is using Steinberg's sequencer Cubase in order to compose his music.

Discography

Solo

Studio albums
 Illusions (2011)
 Sun (2014)
 Humanity (2020–)
 Chapter I (2020)
 Chapter II (2020)
 Chapter III (2021)
 Chapter IV (2021)

Symphonies
 American Dream (2018)
 Seven (2019)

 Two Steps from Hell 
Studio albumsInvincible (2010) Archangel (2011) Halloween (2012)SkyWorld (2012)Classics Volume One (2013)Miracles (2014)Colin Frake on Fire Mountain (2014)Battlecry (2015) Classics Volume Two (2015) Vanquish (2016)Unleashed (2017)Dragon (2019)Myth'' (2022)

References

External links
 
 Modules by Lioz (Playable with VirtualDub)

Living people
1980 births
Two Steps from Hell
Norwegian composers
Norwegian male composers
Demosceners
Tracker musicians
Norwegian record producers